Elections in the U.S. state of New Hampshire are held at national, state and local (county and municipal) level. The state holds the first presidential primary in the national cycle. Elections for a range of state positions coincide with biennial elections for the House of Representatives.

In a 2020 study, New Hampshire was ranked as the 6th hardest state for citizens to vote in.

Elections for state offices 

The state of New Hampshire holds its state general elections on the first Tuesday after the first Monday in November (better known as Election Day) in even-numbered years.  As a result of this, general elections in New Hampshire systematically coincide with the biennial elections for the United States House of Representatives.

During general elections in New Hampshire, elections are held for the positions of Governor, Executive Councilor, state Senator, state Representative, Sheriff, County Attorney, County Treasurer, Register of Deeds, and Register of Probate. Officials elected to all nine of these offices are elected for a term of two years.

Election of County Commissioners also occurs during the state's general elections, but rules for these elections vary by county.  In Strafford County, for example, three County Commissioners are elected to two-year terms at every general election.  In Carroll County, by contrast, three County Commissioners are elected to rotating four-year terms.

New Hampshire's Governor is elected at large; Executive Councilors, state Senators, and state Representatives are elected by district; Sheriff, County Attorney, County Treasurer, Register of Deeds, and Register of Probate are elected by county; and County Commissioners are elected, again, by rules that vary from county to county.

New Hampshire currently has 400 seats in its House of Representatives, 24 seats in its Senate, and five seats on its Executive Council.

National elections 
New Hampshire is well known in national politics for holding the first primary in the quadrennial U.S. presidential election cycle. This New Hampshire primary is actually mandated by state law. New Hampshire RSA 653:9
requires that the state's presidential primary elections be scheduled on the earlier of:

 the second Tuesday in March, or
 no less than seven days prior to the holding of a "similar election" in any other state

History 

New Hampshire voters selected Republicans for office during the 19th and 20th centuries until 1992. Since then, voters have chosen Democrats for U.S. President all but once, while voting Democratic for most state offices in 2006 and 2008 and Republican for most state offices in 2010.  On selected issues, political debate in New Hampshire centers on personal liberty. Historically, New Hampshire was a staunchly conservative state and regularly voted Republican. Some sources trace the founding of the Republican Party to the town of Exeter in 1853. Prior to 1992, New Hampshire had only strayed from the Republican Party for three presidential candidates—Woodrow Wilson, Franklin D. Roosevelt, and Lyndon B. Johnson. The state voted for Presidents Richard Nixon and Ronald Reagan twice by overwhelming majorities.

Beginning in 1992, New Hampshire became a swing state in both national and local elections. The state supported Democrats Bill Clinton in 1992 and 1996, John Kerry in 2004, and Barack Obama in 2008 and 2012. It was the only U.S. state to support George W. Bush in the 2000 election and go Democratic in the 2004 election.  The state has elected three Democrats to the Governorship during this period.

The voters selected Democrats in New Hampshire as they did nationally in 2006 and 2008.  In 2006, Democrats won both congressional seats (electing Carol Shea-Porter in the 1st district and Paul Hodes in the 2nd district), re-elected Governor John Lynch, and gained a majority on the Executive Council and in both houses of the legislature for the first time since 1911. Democrats had not held both the legislature and the governorship since 1874. Neither U.S. Senate seat was up for a vote in 2006.  In 2008, Democrats retained their majorities, governorship, and congressional seats; and former governor Jeanne Shaheen defeated incumbent Republican John E. Sununu for the U.S. Senate in a rematch of the 2002 contest. Barack Obama won the simultaneous presidential election and carried every New Hampshire county for the Democrats for the first time since 1852. It had been thought that Democrats moving in from Massachusetts were responsible for the shift. A 2006 University of New Hampshire survey found that those immigrants were mostly Republican. Their moving had helped the border towns to remain Republican, while other areas had become increasingly Democratic. The study indicated that immigrants from states other than Massachusetts tended to lean Democratic.

The 2008 elections resulted in women holding 13 of the 24 seats in the New Hampshire Senate, a first for any legislative body in the United States.  At the end of the 2008 election cycle, voters registered Democratic outnumbered those registered Republican.

In the 2010 midterm elections, New Hampshire voted out both of its Democratic members in the House of Representatives in favor of Republicans. Republicans also won control of both chambers of the State House by veto-proof majorities, while Governor John Lynch won an unprecedented fourth term. Two years later, in the 2012 elections, New Hampshire voted out both of its Republican members in the House of Representatives in favor of Democrats. At the same time, voters returned Democrats to the majority in the State House of Representatives, while Republicans held on to a narrow 13-11 majority in the State Senate, despite losing the popular vote. Democrat Maggie Hassan won the 2012 gubernatorial election with a 12% margin of victory, with 54.6% of the vote in the gubernatorial election, becoming the first Democrat to succeed another Democrat as Governor of New Hampshire since 1854.

However, Republicans gained control of the State House in 2014, and in 2016 elections, Republican Executive Councilor Chris Sununu was elected as Governor, giving Republicans full control over state government. However, the state narrowly went to Democrat Hillary Clinton over Republican Donald Trump in that year's presidential election. Meanwhile, Democratic governor Maggie Hassan defeated incumbent Republican Kelly Ayotte to join Senator Jeanne Shaheen and Representatives Carol Shea-Porter and Ann McLane Kuster to make the entire congressional delegation represented by the Democratic party for the first time since 1854.

In the 2018 midterm elections, both chambers of the state legislature returned to Democratic control, while Sununu was reelected as governor, resulting in divided government. While New Hampshire Democrats retained their seats in the 2020 federal elections, Republicans regained the majority in the state's Senate, House of Representatives, and Executive Council. New Hampshire's incumbent Republican Gov. Chris Sununu also won the election to his third term in office against Democrat Dan Feltes. This election signaled Republican strength on a state level, flipping the Senate from a 14-10 Democratic majority to a 14-10 Republican majority. The house flipped to the GOP with 213 Republicans and 187 Democrats.

See also 

2020 New Hampshire elections
Government of New Hampshire
Elections in the United States
New Hampshire primary
New Hampshire primary, 2008
Political party strength in New Hampshire
United States presidential elections in New Hampshire

References

External links 
 Elections Division at the New Hampshire Secretary of State official website
 New Hampshire Election Law
 
 
 
  (State affiliate of the U.S. League of Women Voters)
 

 
Government of New Hampshire
Political events in New Hampshire